The Francis R. Chown House is a house located in southwest Portland, Oregon. It is individually listed on the National Register of Historic Places and is also a contributing property of the King's Hill Historic District.  It is located in the Goose Hollow neighborhood.

See also
 National Register of Historic Places listings in Southwest Portland, Oregon

References

Further reading

1882 establishments in Oregon
Goose Hollow, Portland, Oregon
Houses completed in 1882
Houses on the National Register of Historic Places in Portland, Oregon
Individually listed contributing properties to historic districts on the National Register in Oregon
Italianate architecture in Oregon
Portland Historic Landmarks
Victorian architecture in Oregon